Carry On Doctor is a 1967 British comedy film, the 15th in the series of 31 Carry On films (1958–1992). It is the second in the series to have a medical theme. Frankie Howerd makes the first of his two appearances in the film series and stars alongside regulars Sid James, Kenneth Williams, Jim Dale, Charles Hawtrey, Joan Sims, Peter Butterworth, and Bernard Bresslaw. Hattie Jacques returns for the first time since Carry On Cabby four years earlier, while Barbara Windsor returns after her debut in Carry On Spying three years earlier. Carry On Doctor marks Anita Harris's second and final appearance in the series.

Plot
Charlatan faith healer Francis Bigger, who convinces attendees with his assistant Chloe Gibson that "mind over matter" is more effective than medical treatment, suffers an accident during one of his lectures. Admitted to the local hospital, he quickly demands a private room, after encountering his ward's eccentric patients: bedridden layabout Charlie Roper, who fakes symptoms to stay in hospital; Ken Biddle, who makes frequent trips to the ladies' ward to flirt with his love interest, Mavis Winkle, while recovering from an operation; and Mr Barron, whose mental health has declined following news his wife is due to produce his first child, leaving him suffering sympathy pains. During his stay in hospital, Bigger meets the clumsy yet charming Dr Jim Kilmore, who is popular with the patients and who is loved from afar by the beautiful Nurse Clarke, who subsequently causes him trouble by accident while being checked over. The following day after his admission, Bigger meets Dr Kenneth Tinkle, Kilmore's superior who is detested by the patients as much as battleaxe Matron, who harbors an unrequited love for Tinkle.

Shortly after Bigger's arrival, the hospital receives a new novice nurse, Sandra May, who reveals to Clarke that she intends to meet Tinkle to repay him for saving his life - although in reality, she was merely given treatment for tonsillitis. After completing a shift on the wards, May heads for Tinkle's room to profess her love for him, violating hospital rules that female staff are not permitted in the male quarters. However, Tinkle cruelly rebuffs her affection, only to find himself caught in the awkward situation by Kilmore and Matron. Fearing for his position, after the incident and the departure of May and Kilmore, Tinkle contrives with Lavinna that they must cover up the truth. An opportunity soon arises for Tinkle to be rid of Kilmore, when the young doctor spots May go onto the roof of the nurse's home, believing she is going to commit suicide after her encounter with Tinkle, unaware she intends to sunbathe. In trying to rescue her, Kilmore creates an unfortunate scene that leaves him subject to claims of sexual deviancy.

Summoned to a hearing the hospital governor, Kilmore attempts to reveal the truth, but Tinkle and Matron deny the accusation, revealing that May has since been made to leave and that Clarke, who knew what happened on the roof. With his reputation in ruins, Kilmore decides to resign, prompting Clark to reveal what happened to the male patients. Roper, disgusted with what was done to Kilmore, arranges for the whole ward to seek revenge on Tinkle and Matron, with Biddle asking Mavis for the help of the women patients. Conducting a nocturnal mutiny, the patients swiftly subdue Sister Hoggett, preventing her from alerting the orderlies. The group then bring along Bigger, who, believing he is dying and had recently married Chloe - unaware that he misheard Tinkle conversing about him with his assistant - and proceed to capture Tinkle and Matron. While the woman force a confession from Matron by making her endure a blanket bath, the men force Tinkle to confess after threatening him with an enema, after several other methods fail to work.

The next day, Dr Kilmore is appointed the new hospital registrar while Tinkle is reduced to a simple doctor. Mr Barron, now fully recovered and cured, leaves with his wife and their child she had recently had. Meanwhile, Bigger prepares to leave hospital with Chloe, but resents the bickering he must endure and the fact he must give him his work as a faith healer. On the way out, Bigger deliberately falls on the steps and injures his back again, where, while being brought back inside the hospital, he breaks the fourth wall to inform the audience he hopes it will be for a long time.

Cast

Frankie Howerd as Francis Kitchener Bigger
Kenneth Williams as Doctor Kenneth Tinkle
Sid James as Charlie Roper
Charles Hawtrey as Mr Barron
Jim Dale as Doctor Jim Kilmore
Hattie Jacques as Lavinia, the Matron
Peter Butterworth as Mr Smith
Bernard Bresslaw as Ken Biddle
Barbara Windsor as Nurse Sandra May
Joan Sims as Chloe Gibson
Anita Harris as Nurse Clarke
June Jago as Sister Hoggett
Derek Francis as Sir Edmund Burke
Dandy Nichols as Mrs Roper
Peter Jones as Chaplain
Deryck Guyler as Surgeon Hardcastle
Gwendolyn Watts as Mrs Mildred Barron
Dilys Laye as Mavis Winkle
Peter Gilmore as Henry
Harry Locke as Sam
Marianne Stone as Mother
Jean St. Clair as Mrs Smith
Valerie Van Ost as Nurse Parkin
Julian Orchard as Fred
Brian Wilde as Cox & Carter man
Lucy Griffiths as Miss Morrison
Gertan Klauber as Wash orderly
Julian Holloway as Doctor Simmons
Jenny White as Nurse in bath
Helen Ford as Nurses Home nurse
Gordon Rollings as Night porter 
Simon Cain as Tea orderly (uncredited)
Cheryl Molineaux as Women's ward nurse (uncredited)
Alexandra Dane as Female instructor (uncredited)
Pat Coombs as Anxious patient (uncredited)
Bart Allison as Granddad (uncredited)
Jane Murdoch as Nurse (uncredited)
Stephen Garlick as Small boy (uncredited)
Patrick Allen as Narrator (uncredited)

Crew
Screenplay – Talbot Rothwell
Music – Eric Rogers
Production manager – Jack Swinburne
Art director – Cedric Dawe
Editor – Alfred Roome
Director of photography – Alan Hume
Assistant editor – Jack Gardner
Continuity – Joy Mercer
Assistant director – Terry Clegg
Camera operator – Jim Bawden
Make-up – Geoffrey Rodway
Sound recordists – Dudley Messenger and Ken Barker
Hairdressing – Stella Rivers
Dubbing editor – David Campling
Costume designer – Yvonne Caffin
Title sketches – Larry
Producer – Peter Rogers
Director – Gerald Thomas

Filming and locations
Filming dates: 11 September to 20 October 1967

Interiors:
 Pinewood Studios, Buckinghamshire

Exteriors:
 Maidenhead, where the Town Hall doubled for the hospital
 Masonic Hall, Uxbridge
 Westbourne Street, London WC2

Reception
The film was the third biggest general release hit at the British box office in 1968, after The Jungle Book and Barbarella. According to Kinematograph Weekly, there were four British films in the top ten general releases of 1968: Up the Junction, Poor Cow, Here We Go Round the Mulberry Bush and Carry on Doctor.

References

Bibliography

Keeping the British End Up: Four Decades of Saucy Cinema by Simon Sheridan (third edition, 2007: Reynolds & Hearn Books)

External links

 

Carry On Doctor Location Guide at The Whippit Inn
Carry On Doctor at BFI Screenonline

1967 films
Doctor
1960s English-language films
Films directed by Gerald Thomas
Films set in hospitals
1967 comedy films
Color sequels of black-and-white films
Films shot at Pinewood Studios
American International Pictures films
Films produced by Peter Rogers
Films with screenplays by Talbot Rothwell
1960s British films
Films about faith healing